Jaki Shelton Green is an American poet. In November 2009, she was named the first Piedmont Laureate by a collection of Triangle-area arts councils. She currently resides in Mebane, North Carolina. Green teaches Documentary Poetry at Duke University within the Center for Documentary Studies.

Green is a lecturer and workshop facilitator, travelling and teaching at numerous conferences and events. She was appointed North Carolina Poet Laureate in 2018 and re-appointed to the position in 2021.

Early life 
Green was born in Alamance County, North Carolina and grew up in Efland, North Carolina, which is in Orange County. She has said that as a child she was "fidgety" and that her grandmother gave her a writing pad, which she has credited with starting her passion for writing.

Green is a graduate of the George School, which is a private Quaker boarding school in Bucks County, Pennsylvania. She also has a degree in Early Childhood Education from Greater Hartford Community College in Connecticut (now Capital Community College).

Personal life 
Green is married and has at least one daughter, Imani, who died of cancer in June 2009.

SistaWRITE 
Green is the founder of SistaWRITE. She created the organization in order to "bring women and spaces together for writing, community, sisterhood, and shared experience." SistaWRITE has held writing retreats for women writers in Sedona, Arizona; Martha’s Vineyard; Ocracoke, North Carolina; Northern Morocco; and Tullamore, Ireland.

Awards

Jaki Shelton-Green has been honored at the highest levels in the North Carolina literary world, and in 2019 was recognized nationally by the Academy of American Poets.

North Carolina Award for Literature

In 2003, the North Carolina Award for Literature was bestowed on Green for "outstanding performance (and achievement) in literature".

North Carolina Literary Hall of Fame

Green was inducted into the North Carolina Literary Hall of Fame in 2014.

North Carolina Poet Laureate

Green was recognized and appointed to be the 9th North Carolina Poet Laureate in June 2018 and is North Carolina's first African American to receive this recognition. She was scheduled to be installed in the position on September 19, 2018; however, due Hurricane Michael, it was rescheduled to December 10, 2018. She was reappointed to the post in 2021.

Academy of American Poets Poet Laureate Fellow

The Academy of American Poets named Green as one of their first ever Laureate Fellows in 2019.

Further Recognition

Green has also been recognized with numerous additional awards, including these:

 2020 Shaw University Ella Baker Women Who Lead Award
 2020 St. Andrews University Ethel Fortner Arts Award
 2019 Orange County Bahá’i Light of Unity Award
 2016 Kathryn H. Wallace Award for Artists in Community Service

Works 

Jaki Shelton-Green’s work has been published in print, audio-recordings and film. Artists have responded with their own art and collaborations that incorporate Green’s work in sculpture, and the performance arts.

Books
Green has published eight books of poetry.

 Mask (Carolina Wren Press, 1981)
 Dead on Arrival Chapel Hill, N.C. (Carolina Wren Press, 1983) 
 Swiss Time (Mud Puppy Press, 1990)
 Conjure Blues: Poems (Carolina Wren Press, 1996) 
 singing a tree into the dance (Carolina Wren Press, 2003)
 Breath of the Song: New and Selected Poems (Carolina Wren Press, 2005) 
 Feeding the Light (Jacar Press, 2014) 
 I Want to Undie You (Jacar Press, 2017)

Recordings and Film
 The River Speaks of Thirst (Released Juneteenth, 2020)

Collaborations and Works Inspired by Green

Green’s poetry has been performed in dance, with choreography by:
 Chuck Davis African Dance Ensemble in conjunction with the Kennedy Center and the Nasher Museum at Duke University; 
 Two Near the Edge Dance Company; 
 ChoreoCollective;
 Danca Nova Dance Company in partnership with  Colorado Naropa Dance Institute; and 
 Miami City Ballet.

References

Living people
American women poets
Poets from North Carolina
Poets Laureate of North Carolina
Year of birth missing (living people)
21st-century American women